Pterostylis ferruginea, commonly known as the Bangham rustyhood, is a plant in the orchid family Orchidaceae and is endemic to the border area between South Australia and Victoria. It has a rosette of leaves and when flowering, up to ten upright, dark green and translucent white flowers which have an insect-like labellum.

Description
Pterostylis ferruginea, is a terrestrial,  perennial, deciduous, herb with an underground tuber. Flowering plants have a rosette at the base of the flowering spike but the leaves are usually withered by flowering time. The flowers are erect and there are between three and eight stem leaves wrapped around the flowering stem. The lateral sepals turn downwards with their outer edges rolled inwards, and have tapered tips. Flowering occurs from September to November.

Taxonomy and naming
This rustyhood orchid was first formally described in 2009 by David Jones who gave it the name Oligochaetochilus ferrugineus.  The description was published in The Orchadian from a specimen collected in the Padthaway Conservation Park. In 2010 Gary Backhouse changed the name to Pterostylis ferruginea. The specific epithet (ferruginea) is a Latin word meaning "rusty" or "rust-coloured".

Distribution and habitat
The Bangham rustyhood is only known from the Wimmera area of western Victoria and the far south-east of South Australia where it grows in heathy forest and woodland.

References

ferruginea
Endemic orchids of Australia
Orchids of South Australia
Plants described in 2009